No Release may refer to:

"No Release", a song by Rainbow on their 1981 album Difficult to Cure
"No Release", a song by The Psychedelic Furs on their 1987 album Midnight to Midnight
No Release, a project of American musician Brian Fallon